Milton Johnson (born May 15, 1950), known as The Weekend Murderer, is an American serial killer who committed ten known murders in a series of murders that spanned over three months in Will County, Illinois. Two of his victims were police officers.

See also 
 List of serial killers in the United States
 List of serial killers by number of victims

References

External links
 Joliet Mass Murderer Terrorized Area 35 Years Ago

1950 births
1983 murders in the United States
20th-century African-American people
20th-century American criminals
African-American people
American male criminals
American mass murderers
American people convicted of murder
American prisoners sentenced to death
American rapists
American serial killers
Criminals from Chicago
Living people
Male serial killers
People from Joliet, Illinois
People convicted of murder by Illinois
Prisoners sentenced to death by Illinois
Recipients of American gubernatorial clemency
Serial mass murderers